Joyce Green is an area of Dartford in Kent, England. The former Joyce Green Hospital and Royal Flying Corps Station Joyce Green used to be in the area.

History 

Joyce Green was heavily damaged by the 19 July 2022 wildfires.

References 

Dartford
Parks and open spaces in Kent